Maurizio Domizzi (born 28 June 1980) is an Italian association football coach and former defender. He is the head coach of Eccellenza amateurs Castelvetro.

Club career
A S.S. Lazio youth product, Domizzi was farmed to Livorno at Serie C1 in October 1998. In summer 2001, he joined A.C. Milan, by immediately loaned to Modena at Serie B.

Sampdoria
In the next season he joined fellow Serie A club U.C. Sampdoria along with Andrea Rabito on 21 June 2002 in joint-ownership bid, for 2,005 million lire (€1.035 million) each. Domizzi followed the Genoese club promoted to Serie A, and made his debut on 30 August 2003 against Reggina Calcio. Sampdoria also acquired Domizzi outright for another €4 million, with Rabito returned to Milan for undisclosed fee in June 2003.

Domizzi was loaned to Serie A clubs like Modena and Brescia, in the following seasons to seek more first team experience. In August 2005, he joined Serie A newcomer Ascoli, where he scored 4 goals.

Napoli
In summer 2006, he joined Napoli which came back to Serie B from lower levels, for €1.25 million, which Sampdoria retained remain 50% registration rights. After Napoli promoted back to Serie A, He signed a new 4 years contract with S.S.C. Napoli, on 18 June 2007, as the club also bought the remain rights from Sampdoria for €1.5 million.

Udinese 
He joined Udinese on 1 September 2008, on co-ownership with Napoli for €2.5million. In June 2009, Udinese bought the remain half rights from Napoli for €1 million.

In June 2010, his contract was extended to 30 June 2014. On 5 July 2012 he added one more year to his contract, until 2015. His contract was renewed again on 22 May 2014.

Coaching career
After retirement, Domizzi was hired by Pordenone as the club's new Primavera youth coach in 2020.

On 3 April 2021, he was promoted as head coach in charge of the first team, replacing Attilio Tesser at the helm of the Serie B side. After guiding Pordenone to safety in the 2020–21 Serie B, he left the Ramarri by the end of the season.

On 19 June 2021 he was announced as the new head coach of Serie C club Fermana. He resigned on 20 September 2021 following a league loss to Modena.

In June 2022, Domizzi was announced as the new head coach of Eccellenza Emilia-Romagna amateurs Castelvetro for the 2022–23 season.

Managerial statistics

References

External links
Profile

1980 births
Footballers from Rome
Living people
Italian footballers
Association football defenders
Italy under-21 international footballers
U.C. Sampdoria players
Ascoli Calcio 1898 F.C. players
Brescia Calcio players
U.S. Livorno 1915 players
Modena F.C. players
S.S.C. Napoli players
S.S. Lazio players
Udinese Calcio players
Venezia F.C. players
Serie A players
Serie B players
Italian football managers
Pordenone Calcio managers
Serie B managers
Serie C managers